The 2011–12 SC Preußen Münster season started on 23 July against SpVgg Unterhaching in the 3rd Liga.

Review and events

Results

Legend

3rd Liga

Roster and statistics

Sources

SC Preußen Münster seasons
Preussen Munster